Operations Order No. 35 was an order issued by the 509th Composite Group on August 5, 1945 for the atomic bombing mission on Hiroshima, Japan, during World War II. The Order was signed by Operations Officer Major James I. Hopkins, Jr. who would later fly Big Stink in the August 9, 1945 atomic bombing raid on Nagasaki, Japan, under the call sign "Dimples 90".

History
Pursuant to the terms of Operations Order No. 35, at 02:45 on August 6, 1945, the Enola Gay, a Boeing B-29 Superfortress bomber, departed North Field, Tinian, for Hiroshima, Japan, with Colonel Paul W. Tibbets, Jr. at the controls.

The Little Boy atomic bomb was dropped over Hiroshima at 08:15 local time. Tibbets recalled that the city was covered with a tall mushroom cloud after the bomb was dropped.

Notes

Comments
† Big Stink was a backup aircraft for the Hiroshima bombing; it was used for strike observation and photographic purposes for the Nagasaki bombing.

References
 
 

Atomic bombings of Hiroshima and Nagasaki
1945 documents